Crown Mountain is a mountain, 3,830 m, surmounting the west side of Nilsen Plateau, 4 nautical miles (7 km) east-northeast of Mount Kristensen, in the Queen Maud Mountains. Mapped by United States Geological Survey (USGS) from surveys and U.S. Navy air photos, 1960-64. Named by Advisory Committee on Antarctic Names (US-ACAN) to describe the appearance of the summit, a somewhat circular rock band contrasting with the ice surface of Nilsen Plateau.

References

Mountains of Antarctica